The Court of Ardor in Southern Middle Earth is a 1983 fantasy role-playing game supplement published by Iron Crown Enterprises for Middle-earth Role Playing.

Contents
The Court of Ardor in Southern Middle Earth is a supplement which describes the lands of far southern Middle-earth.

Reception
Jonathan Sutherland reviewed the Court of Ardor - In Southern Middle Earth for White Dwarf #50, giving it an overall rating of 7 out of 10, and stated that "The format is the same as the previous volumes, and as well as the major characteristics, mentioning Sauron's influence in the land, the nature of society and suggested scenarios for the players."

William A. Barton reviewed The Court of Ardor in Southern Middle Earth in The Space Gamer No. 73. Barton commented that "It is notable in covering an area that is completedly removed from those in which LOTR is set, allowing GMs and players the greatest freedom of action without fear of changing the history of Middle-earth as outlined in LOTR. A lot of original material here."

Reviews
 Fantasy Gamer #6 (June/July, 1984)

References

Middle-earth Role Playing supplements
Role-playing game supplements introduced in 1983